A casa del Fascio, casa Littoria, or casa del Littorio was a building housing the local branch of the National Fascist Party and later the Republican Fascist Party under the regime of Italian Fascism, in Italy and its colonies. In major urban centers, it was called the palazzo del Littorio or palazzo Littorio. Littorio means lictor, the bearer of the fasces lictorii, the symbol of Roman power adopted by the Fascist party.

History
There were about 11,000 case del Fascio in all. Around 5,000 buildings were constructed specifically as case del Fascio. Many of them were designed by Italian rationalist architects including Adalberto Libera, Saverio Muratori, Ludovico Quaroni, Giuseppe Samonà, and Giuseppe Terragni, but there were also historicist and modern architects.

The Case del Fascio became one of the central points of the new cities and new towns founded under the regime, along with the church and the town hall.

In smaller towns, existing buildings were bought or rented, sometimes unmodified, sometimes specially adapted.

After World War II, the Case del Fascio were turned over to the Italian state under the provisions of Law 159 of July 27, 1944, "Sanctions against Fascism". Often they bear still today signs or emblems of the fascist regime. At present, only the Bolzano former Casa Littoria has been recontextualized, displaying from 2017 onwards a quote from Hannah Arendt placed over a monumental bas-relief with at its center Mussolini himself and publicly contradicting him.

See also
Casa del Fascio (Bolzano)
Casa del Fascio (Como)

Bibliography
L'architettura delle Case del Fascio nella Regione Lazio, a cura di Flavio Mangone e Andrea Soffitta, Alinea, Firenze, 2006

Notes

Italian fascist architecture
Headquarters of political parties